Mary Stirling was an American labor unionist.

Stirling worked as a shoemaker in Philadelphia.  In 1880, she joined a new Knights of Labor local, Garfield Assembly 1684, which she came to run with Mary Hanafin.

In 1883, Stirling was elected as one of eight District 1 delegates to the national Knights of Labor convention.  The conventions had previously been all-male, but union leader Terence V. Powderly ruled that women should be admitted on an equal basis to men.  Stirling was appointed as the Grand Venerable Sage of the convention, and received three votes for Grand Worthy Foreman, the second-in-command of the union.

In 1885, Stirling was elected as General Venerable Sage of the union's convention again.  She was also appointed as secretary of a Knights of Labor committee to collect data on women and work.  In 1886, she received seven votes in the election for chair of the co-operative board.

As of 1902, Stirling was still living in Philadelphia, where she was the forewoman of a department in a large shoe factory.

References

Year of birth missing
Year of death missing
Knights of Labor people
People from Philadelphia
Women trade unionists